Amphidromus pictus is a species of air-breathing land snail, a terrestrial pulmonate gastropod mollusk in the family Camaenidae.

External links 

pictus
Gastropods described in 1896